Peter Judd (born 29 April 1938) is a former English cricketer. Judd was a right-handed batsman who bowled right-arm off break. He was born at Balham, London.

Judd made a single first-class appearance for Surrey against Oxford University in 1960 at Woodbridge Road, Guildford. He wasn't required to bat during the match, while with the ball he bowled ten wicketless overs which conceded 14 runs, with the match ending in a Surrey victory by 4 wickets. This was his only major appearance for Surrey.

References

External links
Peter Judd at ESPNcricinfo
Peter Judd at CricketArchive

1938 births
Living people
People from Balham
English cricketers
Surrey cricketers